The president of the United States in Congress Assembled, known unofficially as the president of the Continental Congress and later as the president of the Congress of the Confederation, was the presiding officer of the Continental Congress, the convention of delegates that emerged as the first (transitional) national government of the United States during the American Revolution. The president was a member of Congress elected by the other delegates to serve as a neutral discussion moderator during meetings of Congress. Designed to be a largely ceremonial position without much influence, the office was unrelated to the later office of President of the United States. Upon the ratification of the Articles of Confederation and Perpetual Union (the new nation's first constitution) in March 1781, the Continental Congress became the Congress of the Confederation. The membership of the Second Continental Congress carried over without interruption to the First Congress of the Confederation, as did the office of president. 

Fourteen men served as president of Congress between September 1774 and November 1788. They came from 9 of the original 13 states: Virginia (3), Massachusetts (2), Pennsylvania (2), South Carolina (2), Connecticut (1), Delaware (1), Maryland (1), New Jersey (1), and New York (1). The median age at the time of election was 47.

Role
The president of Congress was, by design, a position with little authority. The Continental Congress, fearful of concentrating political power in an individual, gave their presiding officer even less responsibility than the speakers in the lower houses of the colonial assemblies. Unlike some colonial speakers, the president of Congress could not, for example, set the legislative agenda or make committee appointments. The president could not meet privately with foreign leaders; such meetings were held with committees or the entire Congress. 

The presidency was a largely ceremonial position. There was no salary. The primary role of the office was to preside over meetings of Congress, which entailed serving as an impartial moderator during debates. When Congress would resolve itself into a Committee of the Whole to discuss important matters, the president would relinquish his chair to the chairman of the Committee of the Whole. Even so, the fact that President Thomas McKean was at the same time serving as Chief Justice of Pennsylvania, provoked some criticism that he had become too powerful. According to historian Jennings Sanders, McKean's critics were ignorant of the powerlessness of the office of president of Congress.

The president was also responsible for dealing with a large amount of official correspondence, but he could not answer any letter without being instructed to do so by Congress. Presidents also signed, but did not write, Congress's official documents. These limitations could be frustrating, because a delegate essentially declined in influence when he was elected president.

Historian Richard B. Morris argued that, despite the ceremonial role, some presidents were able to wield some influence:

Congress, and its presidency, declined in importance after the ratification of the Articles of Confederation and the ending of the Revolutionary War. Increasingly, delegates elected to the Congress declined to serve, the leading men in each state preferred to serve in state government, and the Congress had difficulty establishing a quorum. President John Hanson wanted to resign after only a week in office, but Congress lacked a quorum to select a successor, and so he stayed on. President Thomas Mifflin found it difficult to convince the states to send enough delegates to Congress to ratify the 1783 Treaty of Paris. For six weeks in 1784, President Richard Henry Lee did not come to Congress, but instead instructed secretary Charles Thomson to forward any papers that needed his signature.

John Hancock was elected to a second term in November 1785, even though he was not then in Congress, and Congress was aware that he was unlikely to attend. He never took his seat, citing poor health, though he may have been uninterested in the position. Two delegates, David Ramsay and Nathaniel Gorham, performed his duties with the title of "chairman". When Hancock finally resigned the office in June 1786, Gorham was elected. After he resigned in November 1786, it was months before enough members were present in Congress to elect a new president. In February 1787, General Arthur St. Clair was elected. Congress passed the Northwest Ordinance during St. Clair's presidency and elected him as the governor of the Northwest Territory.

As the people of the various states began debating the proposed United States Constitution in later months of 1787, the Confederation Congress found itself reduced to the status of a caretaker government. There were not enough delegates present to choose St. Clair's successor until January 22, 1788, when the final president of Congress, Cyrus Griffin, was elected. Griffin resigned his office on November 15, 1788, after only two delegates showed up for the new session of Congress.

Term of office
Prior to ratification of the Articles, presidents of Congress served terms of no specific duration; their tenure ended when they resigned, or, lacking an official resignation, when Congress selected a successor. When Peyton Randolph, who was elected in September 1774 to preside over the First Continental Congress, was unable to attend the last few days of the session due to poor health, Henry Middleton was elected to replace him. When the Second Continental Congress convened the following May, Randolph was again chosen as president, but he returned to Virginia two weeks later to preside over the House of Burgesses. John Hancock was elected to fill the vacancy, but his position was somewhat ambiguous, because it was not clear if Randolph had resigned or was on a leave of absence. The situation became uncomfortable when Randolph returned to Congress in September 1775. Some delegates thought Hancock should have stepped down, but he did not; the matter was resolved only by Randolph's sudden death that October.

Ambiguity also clouded the end of Hancock's term. He left in October 1777 for what he believed was an extended leave of absence, only to find upon his return that Congress had elected Henry Laurens to replace him. Hancock, whose term ran from May 24, 1775 to October 29, 1777 (a period of ), was the longest serving president of Congress.

The length of a presidential term was ultimately codified by Article Nine of the Articles of Confederation, which authorized Congress "to appoint one of their number to preside; provided that no person be allowed to serve in the office of president more than one year in any term of three years". When the Articles went into effect in March 1781, however, the Continental Congress did not hold an election for a new president under the new constitution. Instead, Samuel Huntington continued serving a term that had already exceeded the new Term limit. The first president to serve the specified one-year term was John Hanson (November 5, 1781 to November 4, 1782).

List of presidents
Terms and backgrounds of the 14 men who served as president of the Continental Congress:

Relationship to the president of the United States
Beyond a similarity of title, the office of President of Congress "bore no relationship" to the later office of President of the United States. As historian Edmund Burnett wrote:

Nonetheless, the presidents of the Continental Congress and the presidents of the United States in Congress Assembled are sometimes claimed to have been president before George Washington as if the offices were equivalent. The continuous nature of the Continental Congresses and Congress under the Articles also allows for multiple claims of being the "first president of the United States." This would include Peyton Randolph as president of the First Continental Congress, John Hancock as president when the Declaration of Independence was signed, Samuel Huntington as president when the Articles were ratified and took effect, Thomas McKean as the first president elected under the Articles, and John Hanson as the first president under the Articles to serve the prescribed one-year term. Hanson's grandson's campaign to name Hanson the "first president of the United States" was successful in having Hanson's statue placed in Statuary Hall in the US Capitol, even though, according to historian Gregory Stiverson, Hanson was not one of Maryland's foremost leaders of the Revolutionary era. Presumably due to this campaign, Hanson is often still dubiously listed as the first president of Congress under the Articles.

Seal

 
Shortly after the creation of the first die for the Great Seal of the United States, the Congress of the Confederation ordered a smaller seal for the use of the President of the Congress. It was a small oval, with the crest from the Great Seal (the radiant constellation of thirteen stars surrounded by clouds) in the center, with the motto E Pluribus Unum above it. Benson Lossing claimed it was used by all the Presidents of the Congress after 1782, probably to seal envelopes on correspondence sent to the Congress, though only examples from Thomas Mifflin are documented.

This seal's use apparently did not pass over to the new government in 1789. Today's Seal of the President of the United States, which developed by custom over a long period before being defined in law, is a more full-featured version of the Great Seal.

See also
Confederation period
History of the United States (1776–1789)
Founding Fathers of the United States

References

Works cited

External links
 Presidentsusa.net articles"Other" Presidents
 United States House of Representatives articleThe Articles of Confederation

Continental Congress
Continental Congressmen
Continental Congress
United States Continental Congress
United States Continental Congress
Continental Congress
1774 introductions